Kingborough Tigers Football Club is an Australian rules football club, based at Kingston, Tasmania that formerly competed in the Southern Football League in Tasmania before progressing to representation in the statewide Tasmanian State Football League (TSL) in 2014.

History
The club was founded in 1886 as Kingston Football Club and joined the Southern Tasmanian Football Association in 1893 as a junior club before playing its first senior match in the competition on 4 May 1895, against North Hobart at the then STFA Ground, located on the present site of the Cornelian Bay hockey fields. After leaving that competition at the completion of 1907, the club joined the Channel Football Association for one season in 1908 before joining the Kingborough Football Association, where it remained a member from 1909 to 1966. After the horrific bushfires of Southern Tasmania in 1967, the club absorbed the Longley Football Club and joined the Huon Football Association where it remained a member until it left the Association at the completion of the 1995 season to join the newly formed Southern Football League in 1996.

The Tigers tasted immediate success in their new environment, making a Grand Final in their first season, suffering a narrow defeat to Channel and taking out a shock win in the 1997 Grand Final over Claremont. After the SFL was split into two divisions from 2002–2008, the club was a member of the SFL Premier League where it competed amongst the Southern-based former clubs from the TFL.

In 2004 Kingston changed their name to Kingborough Tigers in order to broaden their appeal in the Kingborough region; their stint in the Premier League saw them moderately competitive, making the Elimination Final on a number of occasions but further success avoided them. After AFL Tasmania formed a new statewide competition to start in 2009, this one known as the Tasmanian State League, all teams from the SFL Premier League, with the exception of Kingborough and New Norfolk were invited to join.

Kingborough were knocked back by the sport's governing body due to their poor standard longtime home ground, Kingston Beach Oval (also known as "The Pit"). In 2011 the club moved into its brand new home at Huntingfield near Kingston, known as the Twin Ovals Complex which strengthened its case for future inclusion in the Tasmanian State League, the club had been earmarked as a possible merger candidate with the Hobart Football Club by AFL Tasmania which was met with considerable opposition from both clubs. On September 17, 2011, the Tigers broke through for their first premiership title in fourteen years with an upset victory over the previously undefeated New Norfolk in the SFL Grand Final by 49 points. Ahead of the 2014 season, Kingborough were granted a licence to compete in the State League. Adam Henley coached the side in 2014.

Colours
The Kingston/Kingborough Football Club has worn a variety of differently playing colours throughout its history. In 1893 the club wore rose, primrose and black before changing to scarlet and dark blue the following year. In 1909 the club wore blue and white in its first season in the Kingborough Football Association before adopting a green and white uniform in 1910 which it was to wear until 1920 when it adopted red and black and then black and white before settling in 1946 on the current black and gold colours it wears today.

Summary
Home ground – Kingston Twin Ovals
Established – 1886 as Kingston Football Club (renamed Kingborough in 2004)
Playing colours – Black and gold (since 1946)
Emblem – Tigers
Club theme song – "We're from Tigerland" (Tune: "Row, Row, Row")
Affiliations
STFA (1893–1907) 
Channel FA (1908) 
Kingborough FA (1909–1966)  
Huon FA (1967–1995) 
SFL (1996–2013) 
TSL (2014–present)

Premiership titles
 Kingborough Football Association (10): 1930, 1933, 1936, 1948, 1953, 1958, 1960, 1961, 1965, 1966
 Huon Football Association (3): 1980, 1991, 1995
 Southern Football League (2): 1997, 2011

State League results

Individual records

Individual medal winners
 Ivan Short Medal winners: Unknown

Competition leading goalkickers
 Huon Football Association leading goalkickers: 1980 Bob Smith (118)
 SFL leading goalkickers
 2006 – Michael Darcy (96)
 2011 - Timmothy Lamprill (105)

Club records
 Club record score: Unknown
 Most goals in match: Rodney Herweynan (18)
 Most goals in a season: Wayne Fox (102) in 1994
 Club record games holder: Ray Lorkin (500+)
 Club record match attendance:
 6,907 – Kingborough v New Norfolk at KGV Football Park (2011 SFL Grand Final).

References

External links
Official club website
Club's official Facebook page
Kingborough Football Club website (Archive 2013)

Australian rules football clubs in Tasmania
1886 establishments in Australia
Australian rules football clubs established in 1886
Tasmanian Football League clubs